Hednota argyroeles is a moth in the family Crambidae. It was described by Edward Meyrick in 1882. It is found in Australia, where it has been recorded from the Northern Territory and Queensland.

References

Crambinae
Moths described in 1882